Immaculate Heart of Mary College-Parañaque (IHMC-P, formerly known as Immaculate Heart of Mary School; colloquially, "IMMA") is a Private, Roman Catholic, educational institution run by the Franciscan Sisters of the Sacred Hearts. It is located on a 2.5 Hectare Lot on both sides of St. Dominic Savio Street in Better Living Subdivision, Parañaque City.

History
The college was established in 1979 offering elementary education, then in 1983 it opened to its first group of high school students. The College Department was established in 2004. Admission is open to students of different religion and nationality.

Immaculate Heart Of Mary College Parañaque celebrated the 40th anniversary of their campus in November 2019.

Gallery

References

Catholic universities and colleges in Metro Manila
Catholic elementary schools in Metro Manila
Catholic secondary schools in Metro Manila
Educational institutions established in 1979
Education in Parañaque
1979 establishments in the Philippines